Kobina is a Ghanaian name. It is also the female form of the East Slavic surname Kobin. Notable people with this name include:

 Frank Kobina Parkes (1932–2004), Ghanaian journalist and poet
 Isaac Kobina Abban  (1933–2001), Ghanaian judge
 John Kobina Richardson (1936-2010), Ghanaian industrialist
 Kobina Arku Korsah (1894–1967), Ghanaian judge
 Kobina Nyarko, Ghanaian artist
 Kobina Sekyi (1892–1956), Ghanaian lawyer and politician
 Kobina Tahir Hammond, Ghanaian lawyer and politician
 Samuel Kobina Annim, Ghanaian academic